Grant Connell and Patrick Galbraith were the defending champions but only Connell competed that year with Byron Black.

Black and Connell won in the final 6–0, 6–1 against Karel Nováček and Jiří Novák.

Seeds

  Byron Black /  Grant Connell (champions)
  Patrick McEnroe /  Sandon Stolle (quarterfinals)
  Luis Lobo /  Javier Sánchez (first round)
  Stefan Edberg /  Petr Korda (first round)

Draw

References
 1996 Dubai Tennis Championships Doubles Draw

1996 Dubai Tennis Championships
Doubles